Saskatchewan River Crossing is a locality in western Alberta, Canada. It is located within Banff National Park at the junction of Highway 93 (Icefields Parkway) and Highway 11 (David Thompson Highway). It is administered by Improvement District No. 9.

It was named "The Crossing", when travellers and fur traders used this spot to cross the North Saskatchewan River on their way to British Columbia in the 19th century.

Geography 
It lies as the confluence of the North Saskatchewan River with Howse River and Mistaya River in the Canadian Rockies and is the starting point for tours on the Columbia Icefield and other scenic hiking trails. Mount Wilson, immediately to the north, towers above Saskatchewan Crossing whereas Mount Murchison is prominent to the southeast, and Mount Erasmus to the west.

Services 
It is the only place offering basic services between Lake Louise and Jasper, including gasoline, restaurant, and lodging. However, these services are seasonal, and closed during the winter.

See also 
Alberta's Rockies
Alberta Highway 93

References 

Banff National Park
Localities in Improvement District No. 9
Populated places on the North Saskatchewan River